Gregory Ellis Mathis (born April 5, 1960), known professionally as Judge Mathis, is a former Michigan 36th District Court judge, television court show arbitrator, author, television producer, and motivational speaker. 

Since September 13, 1999, Mathis has presided over his NAACP Image Award and Daytime Emmy winning, syndicated reality courtroom show, Judge Mathis, for which he is best known. His program entered its milestone 20th season on Monday, September 3, 2018. Mathis boasts the longest reign of any African American presiding as a court show judge. Mathis is also the second longest-serving television arbitrator ever, behind only Judith Sheindlin of Judge Judy and Judy Justice by three seasons.

Emanating from the success of his courtroom series, Mathis has also made a name for himself as a prominent leader within the African American community, providing mentorship, charity, and campaign efforts towards the advancement of African Americans. Mathis is also heavily wrapped up in rallying public support, community outreach and philanthropy for the state of Michigan, such as for the Flint water crisis. On May 4, 2022, Mathis was honored with a star on the Hollywood Walk of Fame.

A spiritually inspired play, Been there, Done that, based on his life toured twenty-two cities in the U.S. in 2002. In addition, Inner City Miracle, a memoir, was published by Ballantine Books. On June 19, 2022, a new E! reality program, Mathis Family Matters, premiered, starring Greg Mathis as the paternal head of household along with his family and their various loved ones as they encounter various domestic ups and downs.

Early life
Mathis was born in Detroit, Michigan, to Charles Mathis, a Detroit native, and his wife, Alice Lee Mathis, a devoted Seventh-day Adventist, nurse's aide, and housekeeper. Alice (then divorced Charles) raised Mathis alone in Detroit during the turbulent 1960s and 1970s. Mathis moved to Herman Gardens in 1964 and resided with family until roughly 1970. They moved away from the housing complex to avoid rising drug use and rates of violent crime.

Education
Once out of jail, Mathis began working at McDonald's, a job he needed to keep to maintain his release on probation. A close family friend helped Mathis get admitted to Eastern Michigan University, and he discovered a new interest in politics and public administration. He became a campus activist and worked for the Democratic Party, organizing several demonstrations against South African Apartheid policies.  He graduated with a B.S. in Public Administration from the Ypsilanti campus and began to seek employment in Detroit's City Hall. He also became a member of Alpha Phi Alpha fraternity.

Career

Television
Mathis's biggest claim to fame is his television court show, Judge Mathis, currently in its 24th season as of September 5, 2022. The program is one of the longest-running shows in the court programming genre, 4th in place behind only Divorce Court, The People's Court and Judge Judy (now out of production), respectively. As Divorce Court and The People's Court have suffered temporary cancellations/re-installments/judge-role recasting, Mathis and Judge Judy boasts the longest single-production runs as well as runs with a single presiding judge. With Judge Judy out of production after 25 seasons as of July 2021, Judge Mathis is now the longest-running active single-production court show. Mathis is also the second-longest-reigning arbitrator in courtroom television history.

Following the success of his ongoing court show, Mathis also stars in another program entitled Mathis Family Matters which revolves around himself, his family, and their loved ones as they face domestic highs and lows.

Outside of television
Mathis began his political career as an unpaid intern, and then became an assistant to Clyde Cleveland, a city council member. It was at this time  Mathis took the LSAT and applied to law schools; he was conditionally admitted to the University of Detroit School of Law, which was located in downtown Detroit, walking distance from city hall. He passed a summer course and was officially admitted to the night program, which took four years to complete.

Mathis was denied a license to practice law for several years after graduating from law school because of his criminal past. He received his J.D. from the University of Detroit Mercy in 1987. In 1995, he was elected a district court judge for Michigan's 36th District, making him the youngest person in the state to hold the post. During the five years he was on the bench, he was rated in the top five of all judges in the 36th District; there are about thirty judges each year.

Mathis was appointed head of Jesse Jackson's Presidential campaign in the state of Michigan in 1988. Mathis later became head of Mayor Coleman Young's re-election campaign and after the victory was appointed to run the city's east side city hall.

Mathis has continued to be involved in politics after rising to national entertainment prominence through his television show. Urban politics and African-American movements have been his focus. Most recently, Mathis was invited by the Obama administration to be a part of "My Brothers Keeper", a White House Initiative to empower boys, and men of color.

On June 4, 2011, Detroit-area drivers lined up for blocks as Mathis offered up to $92 worth of free gasoline apiece to the first 92 drivers to show up at a northwest Detroit Mobil station. He told the Detroit Free Press it was a gift to the people who elected him to District Court despite his youthful criminal record. "LA didn't elect me judge," he said. "Chicago didn't elect me judge. Detroiters took a chance on me. It's just the right thing to do. And when you're blessed, you have to look out for the rest." The giveaway took place near the Mathis Community Center, which he funds. Its activities include self-improvement classes, food and clothing assistance, and training for ex-convicts. "No matter what international fame he's achieved, he's still a hometown guy," said WMXD-FM's Frankie Darcell, who announced the location on the air. "Everybody's happy. I'm happy," said gas station owner Mike Safiedine. "The people need it, especially (because) the price is very high."

In September 2008, Mathis wrote a novel called Street Judge, based on the life of a judge who solves murders. It was co-written by Zane, a well-known erotic series writer of Zane's Sex Chronicles. Mathis also wrote a book entitled Of Being a Judge to Criminals and Such.

Activism 
Following his time spent in the Herman Gardens mixed-income housing, Mathis remained devoted to aiding families in the area. In 2003, he lobbied city officials on the behalf of former Herman Gardens residents, imploring lawmakers to allow these individuals their first chance to move into new apartments built where Herman Gardens once stood.

Personal life
Mathis met his wife, Linda, a fellow EMU student, shortly after his mother's death. They would go on to have four children together, a daughter Jade, born May 1985, a daughter Camara, born October 1987, a son Greg Jr. born January 1989 and a son Amir, born July 1990. Mathis who is a member of the City Temple Seventh-day Adventist Church, was awarded the Black History Achievement Award from Oakwood University, which he says is the most meaningful award he has received.

Bibliography
 Mathis, Greg and Blair S. Walker. Inner City Miracle, Ballantine: New York, 2002.
 Mathis, Greg. "Black men must fight back against obstacles." (For Brothers O Ebony (magazine). February 1, 2007. vol: 62:4 p. 38

References

External links
 Judge Mathis Empowerment Network web site
 Judge Mathis television web site

1960 births
African-American judges
American Seventh-day Adventists
African-American television personalities
Eastern Michigan University alumni
Former gang members
Living people
Michigan Democrats
Michigan state court judges
Lawyers from Detroit
University of Detroit Mercy alumni
Television judges